Hypoiodous acid is the inorganic compound with the chemical formula HIO. It forms when an aqueous solution of iodine is treated with mercuric or silver salts. It rapidly decomposes by disproportionation:
 
 5 HIO  →   HIO3  +  2 I2  +  2 H2O
 
Hypoiodites of alkali and alkaline earth metals can be made in cold dilute solutions if iodine is added to their respective hydroxides.
Hypoiodous acid is a weak acid with a pKa of about 11. The conjugate base is hypoiodite (IO−). Salts of this anion can be prepared by treating I2 with alkali hydroxides. They rapidly disproportionate to form iodides and iodates.

References

Hypoiodites
Hydrogen compounds
Iodine compounds
Oxidizing acids
Oxidizing agents
Triatomic molecules